Charles Bwale (born 29 July 1976) is a Zambian football coach and former player who coaches Konkola Blades. A defender, he played in nine matches for the Zambia national team from 2000 to 2003. He was also named in Zambia's squad for the 2002 African Cup of Nations tournament. Bwale was appointed coach of Konkola Blades in late 2020.

References

External links
 
 

1976 births
Living people
Zambian footballers
Association football defenders
Zambia international footballers
2002 African Cup of Nations players
Zambian football managers
Place of birth missing (living people)
Women's national association football team managers